Chilampu is a 1986 Indian Malayalam-language film. Directed by Bharathan, this film is about the revenge by a young man against his uncle who grabbed his family properties by expelling his mother and grandfather from the house. Rahman, Thilakan, Shobhana, Nedumudi Venu, Ashokan, Santhakumari and Babu Antony appeared in leading roles.  The script was written by Bharathan himself, based on a novel by N. T. Balachandran by the same title.

Martial arts has a vital role in the movie. The movie depicts "Kalarippayattu", the traditional martial art of Kerala and also Karate. It is one of the rare and genuine martial arts movies in Malayalam, and was a big hit at the box office. Babu Antony made his debut into cinema by playing the main antagonist in this film. The music was composed by Ouseppachan and the lyrics were by Bharathan.

Plot
Paramu, a young man is living with his grandfather, mother and his sister who is dumb. His family lost their property to his uncle who killed his father in the explosion of explosives set for a festival long back. His sister lost her normal life due to a man who tried to rape her during a festival which also happened long back and when Paramu was a child. The man who raped her, Shankunni is an assistant of Parmu's uncle. One day on the request of his grandfather for the Chilambu (a special ornament of religious significance) Paramu sets off to the place of his ancestral home where his uncle is enjoying their family properties and ancestral home and where the chilambu is now. His childhood friend and fiancée Ambika (daughter of his uncle) was waiting for Paramu's return. She is overjoyed on Paramu's return. The friendship and love rekindle between the two. On his return, Paramu makes his point clear that he has come for nothing but the chilambu. But his resolute and cruel uncle rejects him and threatens to kill him if he comes again for the same demand. Meanwhile, his childhood friends Ramu and Sahadevan also rekindle their friendship with Paramu. To them, Ramu tells why he has come there. When Paramu's intervention becomes unbearable for his uncle he tries to sell off the chilambu to a foreigner and a Christian jewelry merchant. But after experiencing some traumatic supernatural incidents the night after he decided to sell the chilambu, he decides to abandon the idea of selling it. The Christian jewelry merchant also experiences similar supernatural incidents. Later the uncle decides to appoint someone for his security since Paramu is a valiant martial arts expert. He calls his nephew, who knows Karate for his security. One day Ambika comes to Paramu and tells him that she will give him the chilambu if he comes to the ancestral home at night upon her signal. He does the same way. When they meet, Ambika tells him her wish that she wants to bear his child, thereby cleansing the brunt upon the ancestral home. Initially, he drops the idea, but ultimately succumbs to her wish. But sooner she discovers Paramu is carrying martial weapons around his waist. Realizing how deep his wishes are about taking the chilambu back to his family, she tells him that she will show where the chilambu is and gives him a set of keys. When he tries to open the door of the room where the chilambu is kept, the light apparatus which was in Ambika's hand slips and everyone comes to the scene. But Paramu somehow manages to take the chilambu with him. After that, the night ensues his fight between him and the people arranged by his uncle. In that fight, many of them including the man who tried to rape her sister and others get killed or injured. In the end, he rescues Ambika from her parents who try to detain her and leaves the place victoriously with the chilambu and Ambika.

Cast

Rahman as Paramu
Shobhana as Ambika
Innocent as Inashu
Thilakan as Appu Nair
KPAC Lalitha as Kamala
Nedumudi Venu as Sahadevan
Ashokan as Ramu
Babu Antony as nephew of Appu Nair
Bhagyalakshmi
Kottarakkara Sreedharan Nair
Master Vimal
Santhakumari
T. G. Ravi as Shankunni
Rayiz

Reviews
The film tells how certain beliefs are so dear to some people and how, if someone tries to distort that belief either by force or by money, he gets the rebound. The uncle of Paramu who tried to retain the chilambu with force fails miserably and the jewelry merchant and the foreigner who tried to make the chilambu their own with money also fails miserably. In a way, the film tells how important beliefs are despite modernism and scientific innovations. Yet whether Paramu could make a good life after possessing the chilambu (which in a way asserts the truth value of belief systems) remains as an unanswered question. Ambika successfully twists and makes use of the opportunity for a better life which is denied to her (she has a bad omen) because of similar belief systems. Her brother who has turned from medicine to black magic also remains as a contradictory symbol of these belief systems and rituals.

Soundtrack
The music was composed by Ouseppachan and the lyrics were written by Bharathan.

References

External links
 

1986 films
1980s Malayalam-language films
Films directed by Bharathan
Indian films about revenge
Films scored by Ouseppachan